Yellowman (born 1956) is a Jamaican reggae and dancehall deejay and vocalist.

Yellowman may also refer to:
 YellowMan, a tattoo clothing brand by Peter Mui
 Yellowman (candy) a chewy toffee produced in Northern Ireland
 Yellowman (play), a 2002 play by Dael Orlandersmith
 Al Beeno or Prince Yellowman, Jamaican reggae dancehall deejay

See also
 Yellow people